Henry Howard, 5th Earl of Suffolk (18 July 1627 – 10 December 1709) was the youngest son of Theophilus Howard, 2nd Earl of Suffolk, but inherited the title because none of his brothers left surviving sons.

He married three times:
By his first wife Mary daughter and heiress of Andrew Stewart, 3rd Baron Castle Stewart, he had three sons :
Henry Howard, 6th Earl of Suffolk,
Edward Howard, 8th Earl of Suffolk, and
Charles Howard, 9th Earl of Suffolk
His second wife was Mary Ronkswood, a widow.
Mary (died 1721), daughter of Rev. Ambrose Upton, canon of Christ Church, Oxford.

Mary Ronkswood advanced £500 (shortly before her marriage) towards the capital of the lead smelting enterprise of Sir Clement Clerke and his son Talbot, using reverberatory furnaces. However, her husband and her partner in the enterprise, Lord Grandison, were suspicious of the Clerkes. The result was that the enterprise was the subject of litigation, which continued until after Henry Howard inherited the earldom with its associated estates. He seems then to have stopped contesting the litigation, which was decided in favour of the Clerkes.

References 

1627 births
1709 deaths
Henry
Henry Howard, 05th Earl of Suffolk